Benelux Cup or Benelux Friendship Cup, is a defunct friendly football club tournament.

Winners

References

 
Defunct international club association football competitions in Europe
Association football friendly trophies
Benelux